DeSoto County is a county located on the northwestern border of the U.S. state of Mississippi. As of the 2020 census, the population was 185,314, making it the third-most populous county in Mississippi. Its county seat is Hernando.

DeSoto County is part of the Memphis, TN-MS-AR Metropolitan Statistical Area. It is the second-most populous county in the MSA. The county has lowland areas that were developed in the 19th century for cotton plantations, and hill country in the eastern part of the county.

History
The county is named for Spanish explorer Hernando de Soto, the first European explorer known to reach the Mississippi River. The county seat, Hernando, is also named in his honor. De Soto reportedly died in that area in May 1542, although some accounts suggest that he died near Lake Village, Arkansas. See here for a list of sites associated with the 16th-century De Soto Expedition.

Early history
Indian artifacts collected in DeSoto County link it with prehistoric groups of Woodland and Mississippian culture peoples.  Members of the Mississippian culture, who built complex settlements and earthwork monuments throughout the Mississippi River Valley and its major tributaries, met Hernando DeSoto in the mid-16th century when he explored what is now North Mississippi. By tradition, he is believed to have traveled with his expedition through present-day DeSoto County. Some scholars speculate that DeSoto discovered the Mississippi River west of present-day Lake Cormorant, built rafts there, and crossed to present-day Crowley's Ridge, Arkansas. Based on records of the expedition and archeology, the National Park Service has designated a "DeSoto Corridor" from Coahoma County, Mississippi to the Chickasaw Bluff in Memphis.

The Mississippian culture declined and disappeared, and in most areas this preceded European contact. Scholars speculate this may have followed changes in the environment. The town named Chicasa, which De Soto visited, was probably the ancestral home of the historical Chickasaw, who are descended from the Mississippian culture. They had lived in the area for centuries before white settlers began arriving. Present-day Pontotoc, Mississippi developed near the Chickasaw "Long Town," which was composed of several villages near each other. The Chickasaw Nation regarded much of western present-day Tennessee and northern Mississippi as their traditional hunting grounds.

The Chickasaw traded furs for French goods, and the French established several small settlements among them. However, France ceded its claim to territories east of the Mississippi River to Britain in 1763, after having been defeated in the Seven Years' War. The United States acquired the area from the British as part of the treaty that ended the American Revolution.

19th and 20th centuries
The Chickasaw finally ceded most of their land to the United States under pressure during Indian Removal, and a treaty in 1832. They were forced to remove to Indian Territory west of the Mississippi River.

Negotiations began in September 1816 between the United States government and the Chickasaw nation and concluded with the signing of the Treaty of Pontotoc in October 1832. During those 16 years, federal officials pressed the Chickasaw for cessions of land to extinguish their land claims to enable white settlement in their territory. Congress passed the Indian Removal Act in 1830, authorizing forcible removal if necessary to extinguish Native American claims in the Southeast. The Mississippi Legislature formed 10 new counties, including DeSoto, Tunica, Marshall, and Tate, from the territory.

The Chickasaw, a numerically small tribe, were assigned  of land by using that formula. The government declared the remainder as surplus and disposed of the remaining  at public sale. The Indians received at least $1.25 per acre for their land. The government land sold for 75 cents per acre or less.

During and after the Civil War, the area was developed as large plantations by planters for cultivation of cotton, a leading commodity crop. Before the Civil War, they had depended on the labor of thousands of enslaved African Americans. After the war and emancipation, many freedmen stayed in the area,  but shaped their own lives by working on small plots as sharecroppers or tenant farmers, rather than on large labor gangs on the plantations. Reliance on agriculture meant that the area did not develop much economically well into the 20th century, and both whites and blacks suffered economically.

In 1890, the state legislature disenfranchised most blacks under the new constitution, which used poll taxes and literacy tests to raise barriers to voter registration. In the early 20th century, many people left the rural county for cities to gain other opportunities. Most blacks could not vote in Mississippi until the late 1960s, after the passage of federal legislation.

During the Great Depression, the Southern Tenant Farmers Union was organized in 1934. It was open to both black and white sharecroppers and worked to gain better deals and fair accounting from local white landowners. Whites in DeSoto County resisted the effort. In 1935, a white lynch mob attacked early union organizer and minister Reverend T. A. Allen, shot him, and threw him into the Coldwater River. One account said that his body was weighted by chains and that authorities claimed it to be a suicide.

In its 2015 report on Lynching in America (2015), the Equal Justice Institute documented 12 lynchings in the county from 1877 to 1950. Most lynchings in the South took place around the turn of the 20th century.

Since the late 20th century, DeSoto has had considerable suburban development related to the growth of Memphis.

21st century
As part of the Memphis, Tennessee metropolitan area, the early-21st-century DeSoto County has become one of the 40 fastest-growing counties in the United States. That is attributed to suburban development as middle-class and wealthier blacks leave Memphis to acquire newer housing and commute to Memphis for work. Some observers have characterized the shift as black flight, but it is also typical of the pattern of postwar suburban growth in which people who could afford it moved to newer housing in suburbs.

Such suburban residential development in the county has been most noticeable in the Mississippi cities of Southaven, Olive Branch, and Horn Lake. Also stimulating development in the formerly rural area is the massive casino/resort complex, in the neighboring Tunica County, which is the third-largest gambling district in the United States.

Politics

Geography

Geographic features
 Mississippi River
 Coldwater River
 Arkabutla Lake
 Chickasaw Bluffs

Major highways
  Interstate 55
I-55 recently underwent major widening from four lanes to ten from the MS/TN state line south to Goodman Road. Eventual widening of the freeway from Goodman Rd. to Commerce St. will include the addition of a new exit at Star Landing Rd.
  Interstate 69
  Interstate 269
I-269 is a metro Memphis outer loop connecting the cities of Hernando and Olive Branch in Mississippi with Collierville and Millington in Tennessee.
  U.S. Route 51
  U.S. Route 61

Adjacent counties
 Shelby County, Tennessee - north
 Crittenden County, Arkansas - west
 Tunica County - southwest
 Tate County - south
 Marshall County - east

Demographics

2020 census

As of the 2020 United States Census, there were 185,314 people, 65,220 households, and 47,230 families residing in the county.

2013
As of the 2013 U.S.census estimates, there were 168,240 people living in the county. 70.3% were non-Hispanic White, 21.5% Black or African American, 1.6% Asian, 2.6% Native American, 0.1% Pacific Islander, 5.0% were Hispanic or Latino (of any race). The median income for a family was $66,377 and the mean income was $75,875. DeSoto County has the highest median income in Mississippi and the second highest mean income after Madison County.

2000 census
According to the 2000 census, the largest self-identified ancestry groups in DeSoto County were English 53.1%, Scots-Irish 15.1%, African 11.4%, and Irish 4.5%. Since then the percentage of African-American population in the county has nearly doubled, as the total county population has also grown.

Attractions
DeSoto County is known for its golf courses. Velvet Cream, known as 'The Dip' by locals, is a landmark restaurant in the county. Operating since 1947, it is the oldest continually running restaurant in the county. In 2010, it was awarded 'Best Ice Cream in Mississippi' by USA Today. DeSoto County was also previously known as the home of Maywood Beach, a water park that closed in 2003 after more than 70 years of operation.

DeSoto County Museum

A popular attraction is the DeSoto County Museum located in the county seat of Hernando. The museum is open Tuesday through Saturday from 10–5. Admission is free but donations are encouraged. Exhibits include displays on Hernando DeSoto, Civil War history, French colonial and American antebellum homes of the county, civil rights, and the history of each of the county's municipalities.

An eighteenth-century French colonial log house (see photo to the right) has been preserved from the time of French trading and settlement along the Mississippi. This house is similar in style to several French colonial houses preserved in Ste. Genevieve, Missouri, where many French settled after France ceded its territory east of the Mississippi to Great Britain following its defeat in the Seven Years' War.

Hernando DeSoto Park
It is the only location in DeSoto County with public access to the Mississippi River.

Communities

Cities
 Hernando (county seat)
 Horn Lake
 Olive Branch
 Southaven

Town
 Walls

Census-designated places
 Bridgetown
 Eudora
 Lake View
 Lynchburg
 Pleasant Hill

Unincorporated communities

 Cedarview
 Cockrum
 Days
 Handy Corner
 Lake Cormorant
 Lewisburg
 Love
 Mineral Wells
 Nesbit
 Norfolk

 West Days

Former village
 Memphis

Education

Public education in DeSoto County is provided by the DeSoto County School District, the school district for the entire county. It is the state's largest school district. The district is responsible for the operation of eight high schools, eight middle schools, three intermediate (Grades 3–5) and numerous primary schools.

Notable people
 John Grisham, lawyer, writer.
 Olivia Holt, actor, singer.
 Jerry Lee Lewis (1935-2022), singer, songwriter, pianist.
 Austin Riley, MLB shortstop, Atlanta Braves.
 Ricky Stenhouse Jr., NASCAR.
 Nakobe Dean, NFL, Philadelphia Eagles.
 Cody Reed, MLB pitcher, Tampa Bay Rays.

Media
 DeSoto Times-Tribune
 DeSotoCountyNews.com

See also

 National Register of Historic Places listings in DeSoto County, Mississippi
 Bill Hawks, agribusinessman and former state senator from DeSoto County

References

Suggested reading
 Map Guide to the U.S. Federal Censuses, 1790–1920, Thorndale, William, and Dollarhide, William; Copyright 1987.  (Historic state maps including evolution of DeSoto County)

External links

 DesotoCountyMS.gov - Official County Government Website
 DeSoto County Economic Development Council - Official site.

 
Mississippi counties
Counties in the Memphis metropolitan area
Mississippi counties on the Mississippi River
1836 establishments in Mississippi
Populated places established in 1836

la:DeSoto Comitatus